Kavita Surender Kumar Jain (born 2 September 1972) is a Politician, former MLA for Sonipat and Cabinet Minister in the Government of Haryana state, India.

Personal life
Jain is married to Rajiv Jain, formerly Media Advisor to the Chief Minister of Haryana. They have a daughter and a son.

Jain completed M.Com and B.Ed from Rohtak.

Political life
In 2009 and again in 2014, as a candidate of the BJP from Sonepat, she was elected as member of the Haryana Legislative Assembly, India. On 26 October 2014, she was sworn in as Cabinet Minister in the Government of Haryana.

As a minister, she has charge of the following departments.
 Department of Urban Local Bodies, Haryana
 Department of Women & Child Development, Haryana
 Department of Law and Justice, Haryana

References

Living people
Bharatiya Janata Party politicians from Haryana
People from Sonipat
Haryana MLAs 2009–2014
1972 births
Haryana MLAs 2014–2019
State cabinet ministers of Haryana
21st-century Indian women politicians
21st-century Indian politicians
Women state cabinet ministers of India
Women members of the Haryana Legislative Assembly